Flores da Cunha Futebol Clube, also known as Flores da Cunha, is a Brazilian soccer club based in Flores da Cunha, Brazil.

History
This club was founded on January 16, 2016.

Stadium
Flores da Cunha play their home games at Estádio Homero Soldatelli in Flores da Cunha. The stadium has a maximum capacity of 1,500 people.

References

Association football clubs established in 2016
Football clubs in Rio Grande do Sul
2016 establishments in Brazil